Niederhoffer is a surname of German origin and may refer to the following people:

Arthur Niederhoffer (1917–1981), American sociologist and police officer
Galt Niederhoffer (born 1976), American movie producer and novelist
Roy Niederhoffer (born 1966), American hedge fund manager and philanthropist
Victor Niederhoffer (born 1943), American hedge fund manager and writer